Differences between the Catholic Church and the Eastern Orthodox Church may refer to: 

 Ecclesiastical differences between the Catholic Church and the Eastern Orthodox Church
 Theological differences between the Catholic Church and the Eastern Orthodox Church